TYS can refer to:
IATA code for McGhee Tyson Airport in Knoxville, Tennessee, USA
Ten year series of Singaporean examination papers
Television Yamaguchi Broadcasting Systems,  Japan